Poor Moon is an American indie folk band, formed in Seattle in 2012, composed of Christian Wargo, Casey Wescott and Ian and Peter Murray.  Poor Moon is a side project of Wargo and Wescott who are current members of Fleet Foxes, they remain full members of Fleet Foxes while maintaining their separate project with Poor Moon. Poor Moon are signed to record label Bella Union (UK) and Sub Pop Records. The band Poor Moon are named after lead singer Christian Wargo's favourite song by Canned Heat.
The band's debut EP, Illusion, was released in March 2012.

Releases
Illusion EP (March 27, 2012)
Poor Moon (August 28, 2012)

References

American folk rock groups
Bella Union artists
Sub Pop artists